Satoru Hoshino (星野 悟, born February 4, 1989) is a Japanese football player.

Club statistics
Updated to 23 February 2017.

References

External links

1989 births
Living people
Chukyo University alumni
Association football people from Gunma Prefecture
Japanese footballers
J2 League players
J3 League players
Thespakusatsu Gunma players
FC Machida Zelvia players
Association football defenders